Titus Mulama (born 6 August 1980) is a Kenyan international footballer, who plays for the Sofapaka F.C. in FKF Division One.

Career 
Mulama has formerly played in Kenya for Mathare United, Nakuru AllStars and KCB, in the Democratic Republic of Congo for St Eloi Lupopo, in Rwanda for APR, in Costa Rica for CS Herediano, and in Sweden for Västerås SK.

Personal life 
He is the twin brother of fellow player Simeon Mulama.

External links

1980 births
Living people
Kenyan twins
Twin sportspeople
Kenyan footballers
Association football midfielders
Mathare United F.C. players
APR F.C. players
C.S. Herediano footballers
Västerås SK Fotboll players
Sofapaka F.C. players
Kenya international footballers
2004 African Cup of Nations players
Kenyan expatriate footballers
Kenyan expatriate sportspeople in Rwanda
Kenyan expatriate sportspeople in Costa Rica
Kenyan expatriate sportspeople in Sweden
Kenyan expatriate sportspeople in the Democratic Republic of the Congo
Expatriate footballers in Rwanda
Expatriate footballers in Costa Rica
Expatriate footballers in Sweden
Expatriate footballers in the Democratic Republic of the Congo
Nakuru AllStars players